Jane Wagner (born February 26, 1935) is an American writer, director and producer. She is Lily Tomlin's comedy writer, collaborator and wife.

She is the author of The Search for Signs of Intelligent Life in the Universe, The Incredible Shrinking Woman and other Tomlin vehicles.

Early life and education 
Wagner was born and raised in Morristown, Tennessee, where she quickly developed a penchant for writing. She attended Morristown High School, where she wrote for the school newspaper. At 17, she left the hills of East Tennessee to pursue an acting career in New York City, where she also studied painting and sculpture at the School of Visual Arts and piano.

Career 
Early in her life she toured with the Barter Theatre of Abingdon, Virginia, and later became a designer for such firms as Kimberly-Clark and Fieldcrest.

She made her writing debut with the CBS afternoon special J.T. (1969), for which she won the Peabody Award — and drew the attention of Tomlin, who was looking for someone to help develop the Laugh-In character Edith Ann. It was the beginning of a collaboration that continues to this day.

Wagner has been nominated for Grammy Awards, with Tomlin, for the comic's recorded albums and has won three Emmy Awards and a Writers Guild of America award, also with Tomlin, for the comic's television specials.

She wrote and directed Moment by Moment, starring Tomlin and John Travolta, and wrote The Incredible Shrinking Woman, which starred Tomlin.

The Search for Signs of Intelligent Life in the Universe won Wagner a Special Award from the New York Drama Critics' Circle and a New York Drama Desk Award. The film adaptation of the play brought Wagner a Cable ACE Award.

Wagner won a second Peabody for the ABC special, Edith Ann's Christmas: Just Say Noel (1996).

Since its launch in 2008, Wagner has been a contributor for wowOwow.com, a website for women to talk culture, politics and gossip.

Honors, awards and nominations 
Annie Award
1997: nominated – Best Individual Achievement: Writing in a TV Production – Edith Ann's Christmas: Just Say Noel

Drama Desk Award
2001: nominated – Outstanding Revival of a Play – The Search for Signs of Intelligent Life in the Universe
1986: won – Unique Theatrical Experience – The Search for Signs of Intelligent Life in the Universe

Emmy Award
1993: nominated – Outstanding Variety, Music or Comedy Special –
The Search for Signs of Intelligent Life in the Universe
1981: won – Outstanding Variety, Music or Comedy Program –
Lily: Sold Out
1981: nominated – Outstanding Writing in a Variety, Music or Comedy Program – Lily: Sold Out
1976: won – Outstanding Writing in a Comedy-Variety or Music Special – The Lily Tomlin Special
1976: nominated – Outstanding Comedy-Variety or Music Special – The Lily Tomlin Special
1974: won – Outstanding Writing in Comedy-Variety, Variety or Music – Lily

Peabody Award
1996: won – Edith Ann's Christmas: Just Say Noel
1970: won – J.T.

Tony Award
2001: nominated – Best Revival of a Play – The Search for Signs of Intelligent Life in the Universe

On March 16, 2012, Wagner and Tomlin received the 345th star on the Walk of Stars in Palm Springs, California

Works and publications 
 Wagner, Jane, and Gordon Parks, Jr. J.T. New York: Dell, 1971.  
 Tomlin, Lily, and Jane Wagner. On Stage. New York, N.Y.: Arista, 1977. Recorded live at the Biltmore Theatre, New York City. Audio book on LP. 
 Wagner, Jane. Development and Effect of Feminist Consciousness Raising Women's Groups, Los Angeles, Late 1960s Through 1982. Ph.D. Thesis/dissertation. Wright Institute, Los Angeles. 1983. 
 Wagner, Jane, Elon Soltes, Wendy Apple, and Lily Tomlin. Appearing Nitely. Valley Village, Calif.: Tomlin and Wagner Theatricalz, 1992. Recorded live at the Huntington Hartford Theater in Los Angeles, Calif. Originally produced for television in 1978. Video recording. 
 Wagner, Jane. Edith Ann – My Life, So Far. New York: Hyperion, 1994. As told to and illustrated by Jane Wagner.  
 Tomlin, Lily, Jane Wagner, and Anna Deavere Smith. Conversation with Lily Tomlin and Jane Wagner, October 25, 1994. San Francisco: City Arts & Lectures, Inc, 1994. Masonic Auditorium. 
 Wagner, Jane. J.T. New York: Carousel Films, 2000. DVD. Originally broadcast in 1969. Jeannette Du Bois, Theresa Merritt, Kevin Hooks. 
 Tomlin, Lily, and Jane Wagner. And That's the Truth. United States: Universal Music Enterprises, 2003. Recorded live at The Ice House, Pasadena, March 1976. Audio book. 
 Tomlin, Lily, and Jane Wagner. The Search for Signs of Intelligent Life in the Universe. Tarzana, Calif.: Laugh.com, 2005. 1992 HBO television film. A film adaptation of the Broadway play by Jane Wagner. 
 Wagner, Jane, Marilyn French, and Lily Tomlin. The Search for Signs of Intelligent Life in the Universe. New York, NY: ItBooks, an imprint of HarperCollinsPublishers, 2012. Reprint. Originally published: New York : Harper & Row, 1986. Based on the Broadway play written by Wagner starring Lily Tomlin. Includes an Afterword by Marilyn French and Reflections by Lily Tomlin and by Jane Wagner.

References

External links 

 
 
 
 Jane Wagner Biography at www.lilytomlin.com
 Jane Wagner  at wowOwow

1935 births
20th-century American actresses
20th-century American dramatists and playwrights
20th-century American women writers
21st-century American actresses
21st-century American dramatists and playwrights
21st-century American women writers
American women dramatists and playwrights
American stage actresses
CableACE Award winners
Drama Desk Award winners
American lesbian actresses
American lesbian writers
LGBT film directors
American LGBT dramatists and playwrights
LGBT people from California
LGBT people from Tennessee
American LGBT screenwriters
Living people
Morristown High School (Morristown, Tennessee) alumni
American people of German descent
People from Morristown, Tennessee
Actresses from Tennessee
Peabody Award winners
Primetime Emmy Award winners
School of Visual Arts alumni
Writers from Tennessee
Writers from Los Angeles